Few-shot learning and one-shot learning may refer to:

Few-shot learning (natural language processing)
One-shot learning (computer vision)